Horseshoe Lake is a lake in Mono County, California, near the Mammoth Mountain ski resort. The soil near the lake contains a high concentration of carbon dioxide which, when it seeps from the soil, kills trees and poses a threat to humans.

References

Lakes of Mono County, California